GMO Entertainment Unit (Ginny Monteagudo-Ocampo's business unit) was one of the 4 drama units of ABS-CBN. A Subsidiary of Star Creatives, this unit is best known for their long-running daytime teleserye Be Careful with My Heart.

In early 2019, the unit was dissolved with Monteagudo-Ocampo shifting her focus on iWant, where she is the content head.

List of dramas produced by GMO Unit
All these dramas were aired on ABS-CBN.

References

External links

Television production companies of the Philippines